FRL can refer to:

 Fairlie railway station, in Scotland
 Film Reference Library, a Canadian film archive
 Fire Research Laboratory, part of the United States Bureau of Alcohol, Tobacco, Firearms and Explosives
 Fish Rap Live!, a publication at the University of California, Santa Cruz
 Flight Refuelling Ltd, now Cobham plc, a British manufacturer
 Florida Rookie League, now the Gulf Coast League, an American Minor League Baseball league
 Forlì Airport, in Italy
 Frame representation language
 Freedom Airlines, a defunct American airline
 French Radio London, a French-language internet radio station based in London
 Friesland, a province of the Netherlands
 .frl, the Internet top-level domain for Friesland
 Fundació Ramon Llull (Ramon Llull Foundation) a Catalan cultural organization
 Furnace Room Lullaby, an album by Neko Case & Her Boyfriends
 Freedom of Russia Legion, Russians fighting for Ukraine during the 2022 Russian invasion of Ukraine